USS Carmita (IX-152) was a  - a supply ship made of concrete - during World War II. Considered an unclassified miscellaneous vessel, she was acquired and placed in service on 11 May 1944.  The IX-152 was the second ship of the United States Navy to have the name Carmita and was named for the first , a schooner captured during the American Civil War.  The IX-152 was originally known as Slate.  She was attached to Service Force, Pacific Fleet, until 25 September 1946 when she was stricken from the Naval Vessel Register.

References 
 
  USS Carmita (IX-152) by Steve Schwartz

External links
 

 

1943 ships
Carmita